was a Japanese film director known for his Roman Porno films for Nikkatsu during the 1970s.

Life and career

Early life
Masaru Konuma was born in Otaru, Hokkaidō, on December 30, 1937. Konuma retained no memories of his father who was a teacher. Drafted into the army after the outbreak of World War II in 1941, Konuma's father became ill with tuberculosis within a year of the start of his military service, and returned home where he died.

After the war, Konuma's mother remarried, and Konuma, then 15, was sent away to live in Tokyo. Konuma recalled, "In those days, there was no TV. I had no idea about Tokyo. It was as distant to me as Africa or Alaska is to kids today. I didn't want to go. I cried."

As a way of dealing with his loneliness and homesickness at this time, Konuma began going to the cinema. He majored in film studies in the Art Department of Nihon University. Soon after graduation, in 1961, Konuma went to work at Nikkatsu Studios, about the same time as producer Yuki and directors Kōyū Ohara and Noboru Tanaka. The quartet were known by their individual characters as, "Diligent Yuki, slovenly Ohara, faithful Tanaka, reckless Konuma." Konuma started as a "fifth" assistant director, which meant he was in charge of the clipboard. He endured this low position at the studio in the hope that eventually he would become a director. In his early career, he was the assistant director on such films as Nikkatsu's venture into the kaiju genre, Daikyojū Gappa (1967), which was released in the U.S. as Monster from a Prehistoric Planet. Seijun Suzuki was one of the few directors who impressed Konuma during these early years at Nikkatsu.

Roman Porno
During the later 1960s, Nikkatsu began losing its audience to TV, and its film production dropped. At this time, assistant directors moved on to TV or non-film work. In order to find a new audience, Nikkatsu president Takashi Itamochi made the decision to put the company's high production values and professional talent entirely into the "pink-film" (softcore pornographic) industry, which had until then been made by independent and low-budget filmmakers like Kōji Wakamatsu. Many of Nikkatsu's staff either did not return to the studio or left, not wanting to make sex films. Konuma had no such reservations, however, later saying, "The pleasure of becoming a director was greater than anything else at that moment... I was just happy to be making movies."

Konuma's first assignment as director was Call of the Pistil in 1971. Two of his most popular films-- Flower and Snake and Wife to Be Sacrificed—were made for Nikkatsu in 1974, both with Naomi Tani. Though it was Konuma who brought Oniroku Dan's work to the mainstream through Flower and Snake, the author was reportedly never happy with Konuma's interpretation of his work or the SM genre. The success of Flower and Snake inspired a Flower and Snake series which ran through the 1970s and returned in the mid-1980s.

In Konuma's nunsploitation film Cloistered Nun: Runa's Confession (1976), half-Japanese pop singer Runa Takamura made her Roman Porno debut. For Lady Karuizawa (1982), Konuma worked with the mainstream 1960s star, Miwa Takada in her first starring role in over a decade. The film was a variation on Lady Chatterley's Lover, with some added political intrigue. Corrida of Sex and Love a.k.a. In The Realm Of Sex (1977) was Nikkatsu's attempt to capitalize on the notoriety surrounding the domestic release of Ōshima's In the Realm of the Senses (1976).

Commenting on his association with the S/M subgenre of Nikkatsu's Roman Pornos, Konuma said, "In general, the roman porn audience wants to see something they can't experience in everyday life. These people get excited about seeing acts which they may - or may not want to do to their wives or mates. Things they would never be able to really do without ending up in jail or divorce. For example, I was often assigned to make movies with rape scenes. I am not a person who could possibly perform rape. I want to see a lady's happy face while having sex... Movies are fantasies. Sometimes they might be ugly, but they're still fantasies. I was the dreamweaver."

In 2000, director Hideo Nakata, who had served his apprenticeship at Nikkatsu under Konuma, made a documentary on his mentor entitled Sadistic and Masochistic. In 2001 Konuma was given an award at the Yokohama Film Festival for his career and his film Nagisa.

Partial filmography

See also
 List of Nikkatsu Roman Porno films

Notes

Bibliography
 Konuma, Masaru. (1998). Interviewed by Thomas and Yuko Mihara Weisser on November 6, 1998, in Asian Cult Cinema, #22, 1st Quarter, 1999, p. 19-28.
 
 
 
 
 Masaru Konuma at nytimes.com

1937 births
2023 deaths
Japanese film directors
Pink film directors
Nihon University alumni
People from Otaru